The Te Deum for the Victory at the Battle of Dettingen in D major, HWV 283, is the fifth and last setting by George Frideric Handel of the 4th-century Ambrosian hymn, Te Deum, or We Praise Thee, O God. He wrote it in 1743, only a month after the battle itself, during which Britain and its allies Hannover and Austria soundly routed the French.

Background
On 27 June 1743, the British army and its allies, under the command of King George II and Lord Stair, won a victory at the Battle of Dettingen, over the French army, commanded by the Maréchal de Noailles and the Duc de Grammont. On the King's return a day of public thanksgiving was appointed, and Handel, at that time "Composer of the Musick to the Chapel Royal," was commissioned to write a Te Deum and an anthem ("The King Shall Rejoice") for the occasion. The work was composed between 17 and 29 July 1743 and was first performed on 27 November 1743 in the Chapel Royal of St James's Palace, London in the presence of George II.

Musical analysis
The Dettingen Te Deum is not a Te Deum in the strict sense, but a grand martial panegyric. It contains eighteen short solos and choruses, mostly of a brilliant, martial character, the solos being divided between the alto, baritone, and bass. After a brief instrumental prelude, the work opens with the triumphant, jubilant chorus with trumpets and drums ("We praise Thee, O God"), written for the five parts, the sopranos being divided into first and seconds, containing also a short alto solo leading to a closing fugue.

The second number ("All the earth doth worship Thee") is also an alto solo with five-part chorus of the same general character. It is followed by a semi-chorus in three parts ("To Thee all Angels cry aloud"), plaintive in style, and leading to the full chorus ("To Thee, Cherubin and Seraphim"), which is majestic in its movement and rich in harmony. The fifth number is a quartet and chorus ("The glorious Company of the Apostles praise Thee"), dominated by the bass, with responses from the other parts, and is followed by a short, full chorus ("Thine honourable, true, and only Son"). The seventh number is a stirring bass solo with trumpets. A fanfare of trumpets introduces the next four numbers, all choruses. In this group the art of fugue and counterpoint is splendidly illustrated, but never to the sacrifice of brilliant effect, which is also heightened by the trumpets in the accompaniments. An impressive bass solo ("Vouchsafe, O Lord") intervenes, and then the trumpets sound the stately symphony to the final chorus ("O Lord, in Thee have I trusted"). It begins with a long alto solo with delicate oboe accompaniment that makes the effect very impressive when voices and instruments take up the phrase in a magnificent outburst of power and rich harmony, and carry it to the close.

Recordings
Handel: Dettingen Te Deum - Choir of Trinity College, Cambridge, Academy of Ancient Music, Stephen Layton (conductor), 2008, Hyperion Records: CDA67678
Handel: Dettingen Te Deum, Dettingen Anthem - Choir of Westminster Abbey, The English Concert, Simon Preston (conductor), 1984, Deutsche Grammophon: Archiv 410 6472

Sources
This article incorporates text from:
Upton, George P., The Standard Oratorios: Their Stories, Their Music, and Their Composers, Chicago: A. C. McClurg & Co. 1893, pp. 155–158

External links
Liner Notes for Handel: Dettingen Te Deum (Hyperion CDA67678)
 

Compositions by George Frideric Handel
1743 compositions
Handel